Boxing competitions at the 2011 Pan American Games in Guadalajara will be held from October 21 to October 29 at the Expo Guadalajara Arena. Both the Bahamas and Barbados won their first ever Pan American boxing medals.

Medal summary

Medal table

Men's events

Women's events

Schedule

Qualification

There will be three qualifying tournaments.

For the women's events, the two finalists from each tournament and one host nation athlete will qualify for a total of 7 athletes. For the men's categories, there are different amount of spots available for each weight class.

Qualification timeline

Summary

See also
 Boxing at the Pan American Games

References

 
Events at the 2011 Pan American Games
2011
Pan American Games